Gowhert (also Romanized as Gowhert and Gowhart; also known as Gohart, Gohert, Gohort, Gowhīrat, Gowhīrot, and Kowheyrat) is a village in Surak Rural District, Lirdaf District, Jask County, Hormozgan Province, Iran. At the 2006 census, its population was 748, in 155 families.

References 

Populated places in Jask County